Little Italy is a 2018 Canadian-American romantic comedy film directed by Donald Petrie, with a screenplay by Steve Galluccio and Vinay Virmani from a story by Virmani. The film stars Emma Roberts, Hayden Christensen, Alyssa Milano, Adam Ferrara, Gary Basaraba, Linda Kash, Andrew Phung, Cristina Rosato, Danny Aiello, Andrea Martin and Jane Seymour. The film features one of Aiello's final film appearances before his death in 2019.

Plot
Nikki and Leo both grow up in Toronto's Little Italy neighborhood, where their families are running a pizza business together. After winning a pizza competition together, a feud developed between Nikki's father Sal and Leo's father Vince which caused them to dissolve their partnership and start separate restaurants next door to each other. The pair have never told anyone what started the feud between them. Nikki eventually leaves her family to go to London to become a chef, while Leo remains in Toronto to work at his father's restaurant. After several years, Nikki is given the option to compete for the chance to run her instructor Corinne's new restaurant. Corinne gives Nikki two weeks off to prepare her menu and return home to Toronto.

Leo still works at his father's restaurant but has moved out of his parents' house and lives with his friend Luigi above Luigi's bar, where Leo also bartends. The feud between Vince and Sal has escalated over the years, with Vince having Sal investigated for tax evasion and Sal attempting to have Vince's Indian employee Jogi deported. Upon arriving home in Toronto, Nikki meets Leo at the bar and they drunkenly play soccer in a midst of a thunderstorm. Nikki passes out and spends the night at Leo's, while he sleeps on the couch. The next day, she is welcomed by her family on her arrival. Vince and Jogi are arrested after Sal and his Indian employee Jessie replace the oregano at Vince's restaurant with marijuana, but are soon released. Jessie and Jogi share a mutual unspoken attraction, despite working for the rival restaurants. Additionally, Leo's grandfather Carlo and Nikki's grandmother Franca have been dating in secret as they only outwardly participate in the feud.

Nikki's mother and friends try to set her up with several single men from the neighborhood, but she is uninterested. She grows closer to Leo as they cook together at his apartment, and is impressed with his creativity and cooking skills. Carlo proposes to Franca and professes his love for her, but she walks away without giving him an answer. Nikki encourages Leo to serve his pizza out of Vince's restaurant, but he tells her his father is stubborn and opposed to changing the menu. He confides in her that he will open his own restaurant after his father retires, so he will not be forced to compete with Vince.

Franca finally agrees to marry Carlo despite her promise not to remarry after her husband died. Nikki and Leo go for a ride around Little Italy, where they relive their childhood experiences together. They return to Leo's apartment, where they sleep together. Nikki receives a call from Corinne, reminding her that she needs the menu in a few days, otherwise she will promote another chef. Struggling, Nikki expresses her regrets to Leo.

Franca and Carlo arrange a dinner for the families, during which they announce their relationship, but do not reveal their engagement. Upset at the revelation that their parents have been dating, Sal and Vince begin exchanging insults. Vince proposes entering a pizza competition against Sal saying that whoever loses will have to leave Little Italy. When they are reminded they are banned from the competition because of their fight years ago, they decide to have Nikki and Leo enter the competition. Nikki initially refuses to compete, and Vince asserts it is because she afraid to face Leo. Nikki and Leo start arguing about who let who win in soccer when they were kids. Leo makes a reference to them sleeping together the night before, and Nikki slaps him and storms out in anger.

At the competition, Leo is declared the winner and Nikki departs to the airport for London. However, Leo refuses to take the trophy after he realizes that Nikki had purposely switched their sauces so that Leo would win. Realizing that Nikki has gone to the airport, Leo and their families go after her. At the airport, Leo finds Nikki and declares that all he wants in life is her and that he is in love with her. Although she initially appears to reject him, she ultimately decides to stay with Leo. She declares her mutual love for him and they kiss. They confront their fathers about their fight years ago, and Sal and Vince admit that the fight was indirectly about their parents Franca and Carlo. In 1999, after winning the pizza competition, Sal and Vince argued about who to name the winning pizza after, resulting in the beginning of the rivalry. Franca and Carlo finally announce that they are getting married. Sal and Vince hug each other, formally ending the rivalry.

Some time later, the families celebrate at Nikki and Leo's new restaurant. Corinne, who came to Toronto to convince Nikki to return to London, reveals that she had to shut down her new restaurant after receiving negative reviews from critics. The families all dance together, and Nikki and Leo finally set up Jessie and Jogi as a couple.

Cast

 Emma Roberts as Nicoletta "Nikki" Angioli
 Ava Preston as young Nikki
 Hayden Christensen as Leonard "Leo" Campoli
 Nicky Cappella as young Leo
 Alyssa Milano as Dora Angioli
 Adam Ferrara as Salvatore "Sal" Angioli
 Gary Basaraba as Vincenzo "Vince" Campoli
 Linda Kash as Amelia Campoli
 Andrew Phung as Luigi 
 Cristina Rosato as Gina
 Danny Aiello as Carlo
 Andrea Martin as Franca
 Jane Seymour as Corinne
 Amrit Kaur as Jessie
 Martin Roach as Officer Hardaz
 Vas Saranga as Jogi
 Rodrigo Fernandez-Stoll as Ramon

Production
In July 2017, it was announced Hayden Christensen, Emma Roberts, Andrea Martin, Alyssa Milano, Danny Aiello, Adam Ferrara, Gary Basaraba, Andrew Phung, and Jane Seymour had joined the cast of the film, with Donald Petrie directing from a screenplay by Steve Galluccio and Vinay Virmani. Pauline Dhillon and Ajay Virmani served as producers on the film, while Fred Fuchs, Tiffany Kuzon, Patrick Roy and Christina Kubacki served as executive producers, under their Firsttake Entertainment, Telefilm Canada and Gem Entertainment banners, respectively. Entertainment One handled distribution in Canada.

Principal photography began in June 2017.

Release
The film was released in Canada on August 24, 2018, by Entertainment One and in the United States on September 21, 2018, by Lionsgate.

Reception
On Metacritic, the film has a weighted average score of 28 out of 100, based on 4 critics, indicating "generally unfavorable reviews." Writing in the Chicago Sun-Times, film critic Richard Roeper described the film as "extra-cheesy and terrible, but there IS a certain comfort-viewing pleasure to be had from watching the wonderful cast gamely attempting to sell exchanges." Katie Walsh of the Los Angeles Times described the film as "more about cartoonish cultural stereotypes than finding love," "limp and formulaic," and featuring "wildly outdated cultural stereotypes about Italian New Yorkers, Indian folks, gay people and others." Barry Hertz of The Globe and Mail wrote that "Emma Roberts and Hayden Christensen [...] deserve so much better than the wan caricatures they are stuck with" and that the film "is either a remarkable act of misguided self-parody – a work so subversive that any trace of artistic irony ends up being invisible to the naked eye – or a solid case that its filmmaker fundamentally misunderstands the modern world." 

The movie was widely mocked as one of the worst movies of the year. It was the pick for episode 206 of the podcast How Did This Get Made?, which discusses unusually terrible films.  When trailers were released confirming it was an actual movie, the film was widely mocked on social media and failed to get a wide theatrical release, screening in just a handful of theatres and being made available On Demand while still in theatres.

See also 
 Mystic Pizza, a 1988 romantic film with a similar pizza restaurant setting.
 Pizza My Heart (film), a 2005 romantic-comedy featuring a very similar premise of two competing pizza restaurants.

References

External links
 

2018 romantic comedy films
2018 films
2010s English-language films
2010s American films
2010s Canadian films
American romantic comedy films
Canadian romantic comedy films
English-language Canadian films
Films about chefs
Films about dysfunctional families
Films about widowhood
Films directed by Donald Petrie
Films set in 1999
Films set in 2018
Films set in London
Films set in restaurants
Films set in Toronto
Films shot in Toronto
Lionsgate films
Voltage Pictures films
Works about Italian-Canadian culture